Selin Yeninci (born 16 January 1988) is a Turkish actress.

Life and career 
Selin Yeninci was born on 16 January 1988 in Istanbul. Yeninci graduated from İzmir Atatürk High School in 2006, where she was the student head of the theatre department. In 2011, she finished her studies at Dokuz Eylül University School of Fine Arts. Following her graduation, Yeninci joined Oyun Atölyesi, where she acted alongside Haluk Bilginer in adaptations of Macbeth, La nuit de Valognes, etc. She rose to prominence with her role as Saniye in the TV series Bir Zamanlar Çukurova.

Yeninci is a recipient of two Best Supporting Actress awards from International Adana Film Festival and 53rd Turkish Film Critics Association Awards, respectively.

Filmography

Awards and nominations

References

External links 
 
 

1988 births
Living people
Actresses from Istanbul
Dokuz Eylül University alumni
Turkish television actresses
Turkish film actresses
21st-century Turkish actresses